Johannes Bunzek (22 May 1922 – 11 December 1943) was a German Luftwaffe ace credited with 75 victories, all on the Eastern Front. Knight's Cross of the Iron Cross during World War II. Bunzek was killed on 11 December 1943 over Nikopol, Ukraine. He was posthumously awarded the Knight's Cross of the Iron Cross on 6 April 1944.

Career
Bunzek was born on 22 May 1922 in Groß-Strehlitz, present-day Strzelce Opolskie in southern Poland, at the time in the Province of Upper Silesia of the Weimar Republic. He joined the military service of the Luftwaffe and completed his training with Luftkriegsschule 4 (LKS 4—4th Air War School) in July 1942. Bunzek was then posted to 7. Staffel (7th squadron) of Jagdgeschwader 52 (JG 52—52nd Fighter Wing) in late 1942. At the time, 7. Staffel was commanded by Hauptmann Adalbert Sommer who was replaced by Oberleutnant Walter Krupinski on 15 March 1943. The Staffel was part of III. Gruppe of JG 52 under command of Major Hubertus von Bonin.

War against the Soviet Union

World War II in Europe had begun on Friday 1 September 1939 when German forces invaded Poland. Germany had launched Operation Barbarossa, the invasion of the Soviet Union on 22 June 1941. In late 1942, III. Gruppe was based at an airfield named Soldatskaja, located approximately halfway between Mozdok and Pyatigorsk on the Eastern Front. The Gruppe stayed at this airfield until 1 January 1943. During this period, the pilots occasionally also operated from airfields at Mozdok (15, 18, 19, 21, 22 and 23 October) and from Digora (5 to 17 November 1942), supporting Army Group A in the Battle of the Caucasus. On 1 April 1943, III. Gruppe was moved to the combat area of the Kuban bridgehead where it was based at an airfield at Taman. Operating from Taman until 2 July, III. Gruppe also flew missions from Kerch on 12 May, from Sarabuz and Saky on 14 May, Zürichtal, present-day Solote Pole, a village near the urban settlement Kirovske on 23 May, and Yevpatoria on 25/26 June. Here, Bunzek claimed his first aerial victory over a Lavochkin-Gorbunov-Gudkov LaGG-3 fighter on 28 May.

On 1 November, III. Gruppe was moved to Apostolove fighting in the combat area between Nikopol and Zaporizhzhia. Adverse whether conditions rendered the airfield unusable and the Gruppe temporarily used an airfield near Kirovograd from 12 to 20 November. On 11 December, Bunzek was killed in action in his Messerschmitt Bf 109 G-6 (Werknummer 20644—factory number) following combat with Ilyushin Il-2 ground-attack aircraft and LaGG-3 fighters during the Battle of the Dnieper. He was initially reported as missing in action west of Nikopol. According to Barbas, this combat took place near near Apostolove while fighting over the bridgehead established by Soviet forces at Nikopol. Bunzek was posthumously awarded the Knight's Cross of the Iron Cross on 6 April 1944.

Summary of career

Aerial victory claims
According to Spick, Bunzek was credited with 75 aerial victories in an unknown number of combat missions, all of which claimed on the Eastern Front. Weal states that in addition to his 75 aerial victories, he also had 30 further unconfirmed claims. Mathews and Foreman, authors of Luftwaffe Aces — Biographies and Victory Claims, researched the German Federal Archives and found records for 78 aerial victory claims, plus two further unconfirmed claims, all of which claimed on the Eastern Front.

Victory claims were logged to a map-reference (PQ = Planquadrat), for example "PQ 34 Ost 76791". These sectors were then subdivided into 36 smaller units to give a location area 3 × 4 km in size.

Awards
 Flugzeugführerabzeichen (3 September 1942)
 Front Flying Clasp of the Luftwaffe in Gold
 Iron Cross (1939)
 2nd Class (14 July 1943)
 1st Class (2 August 1943)
 Honor Goblet of the Luftwaffe on 8 November 1943 as Leutnant and pilot
 German Cross in Gold 14 November 1943 as Leutnant in the 7./Jagdgeschwader 52
 Knight's Cross of the Iron Cross on 6 April 1944 as Leutnant and pilot in the 7./Jagdgeschwader 52

Notes

References

Citations

Bibliography

External links
TracesOfWar.com
Ritterkreuztraeger 1939-1945

1922 births
1943 deaths
People from Strzelce Opolskie
People from the Province of Silesia
Luftwaffe pilots
German World War II flying aces
Recipients of the Gold German Cross
Recipients of the Knight's Cross of the Iron Cross
Luftwaffe  personnel killed in World War II
Aviators killed by being shot down